Percy Strong (1896–1939) was a British cinematographer. During his career, Strong worked on a mixture of prestige films and supporting features. He was sometimes credited as Percival Strong.

Selected filmography
 The Flame (1920)
 The River of Stars (1921)
 Gwyneth of the Welsh Hills (1921)
 The Romany (1923)
 Love, Life and Laughter (1923)
 Not for Sale (1924)
 Reveille (1924)
 The Maid at the Palace (1927)
 The Flight Commander (1927)
 Quinneys (1927)
 The Glad Eye (1927)
 Balaclava (1928)
 Palais de danse (1928)
 High Treason (1929)
 The Devil's Maze (1929)
 The Night Porter (1930)
 Greek Street (1930)
 No Lady (1931)
 Down River (1931)
 The Happy Ending (1931)
 Bracelets (1931)
 East Lynne on the Western Front (1931)
 After the Ball (1932)
 Soldiers of the King (1933)
 The Girl in the Flat (1934)
 The Last Journey (1936)

Bibliography
 Low, Rachael. ''History of the British Film: Filmmaking in 1930s Britain. George Allen & Unwin, 1985 .

External links

1896 births
1939 deaths
British cinematographers
Film people from London